The World Figure Skating Championships is an annual figure skating competition sanctioned by the International Skating Union in which figure skaters compete for the title of World Champion.

Men's and pairs' competitions took place from February 16 to 17 in Budapest, Hungary. Ladies' competitions took place from February 8 to 9 in Vienna, Austria.

Results

Men

Judges:
 Herbert J. Clarke 
 H. Günauer 
 Charles Sabouret 
 Fritz Schober 
 Andor Szende

Ladies

Judges:
 A. Anderberg 
 W. Bayerle 
 Herbert J. Clarke 
 A. Huber 
 R. Lund 
 Charles Sabouret 
 J. Sykora

Pairs

Judges:
 Herbert J. Clarke 
 R. Kaler 
 Władysław Kuchar 
 L. von Orbán 
 Fritz Schober

Sources
 Result List provided by the ISU

World Figure Skating Championships
World Figure Skating Championships
International figure skating competitions hosted by Austria
Sports competitions in Vienna
1935 in Hungarian sport
1935 in Austrian sport
1930s in Vienna
1930s in Budapest
February 1935 sports events
International sports competitions in Budapest